Spain participated in the Eurovision Song Contest 2001 with an entry selected through a national preselection called Eurocanción 2001. David Civera with the song "Dile que la quiero", composed by Alejandro Abad (Spanish entrant in 1994), was chosen to represent Spain. At Eurovision, David Civera finished sixth with 76 points.

Before Eurovision

Eurocanción 2001 
Eurocanción 2001 is the national final developed by RTVE in order to select Spain's entry for the Eurovision Song Contest 2001. The competition took place on 23 February 2001 at TVE's studios in Madrid, and was hosted by Jennifer Rope and Sandra Morey.

Format
The winner was decided by a nine-member jury panel (75%) and public televoting (25%). Each jury member awarded points in the Eurovision style of 12, 10, 8-1 point(s). The public televote had a weighing equal to the votes of three juries.

Competing entries
In order to select entries for the contest, Spanish broadcaster RTVE opened a submission period for artists and composers to submit their songs. In addition to the open submissions, RTVE also directly invited more than 30 composers to submit songs. Over 1000 entries were submitted, and 15-member jury panel appointed by RTVE listened to the entries and selected 20 songs for the contest.

Final
The final took place on 23 February 2001 at TVE's studios in Madrid. David Civera got the highest number of points from both the jury and the audience and was proclaimed winner and entrant for Spain at the Eurovision Song Contest 2001.

The members of the jury were Augusto Algueró, Pilar Tabares, Teresa Segura, Daniel Velázquez, Juan Ignacio Ocaña, Hugo de Campos, Silvia Gambino, Juan Luis Ayllón Piquero and José Martín Alfageme.

At Eurovision
At Eurovision, Civera performed 13th. At the close of the voting he had received 76 points, placing 6th of 23. "Dile que la quiero" was released as a CD single, which charted in Spain's Promusicae Top 50 peaking at number 2.

Voting

References

2001
Countries in the Eurovision Song Contest 2001
Eurovision
Eurovision